Desulfovibrio butyratiphilus is a bacterium. It is Gram-negative, butyrate-oxidizing and sulfate-reducing. It is also strictly anaerobic, mesophilic, motile by means of a single polar flagellum, non-spore-forming and rod-shaped. Its type strain is BSYT (=5JCM 15519T =5DSM 21556T).

References

Further reading
Staley, James T., et al. "Bergey's manual of systematic bacteriology, vol. 3."Williams and Wilkins, Baltimore, MD (1989): 2250–2251.

External links
LPSN

Type strain of Desulfovibrio butyratiphilus at BacDive -  the Bacterial Diversity Metadatabase

Bacteria described in 2010
Desulfovibrio